Douglas Gray, FBA (17 February 1930 – 7 December 2017) was a New Zealand-born literary scholar who was the first J. R. R. Tolkien Professor of English Literature and Language at the University of Oxford and a Professorial Fellow of Lady Margaret Hall, Oxford, both between 1980 and 1997. He began his career as an assistant lecturer at the Victoria University of Wellington (1952–54), where he had graduated in 1952. Gray then studied at Merton College, Oxford, where he gained a BA in 1956. He then lectured at Pembroke College, Oxford, where he was elected to a fellowship in 1961, remaining there until his appointment to the Tolkien chair in 1980; he had also been a university lecturer since 1976. He was elected a Fellow of the British Academy in 1989.

Publications 

 Themes and Images in the Medieval English Religious Lyric (Routledge & Kegan Paul, 1972).
 A Selection of Religious Lyrics (Clarendon Press, 1975).
 Robert Henryson, Medieval and Renaissance Authors (E. J. Brill, 1979).
 The Oxford Book of Late Medieval Verse and Prose (Clarendon Press, 1985).
 (Co-authored with J. A. W. Bennett) Middle English Literature: 1100–1400, Oxford History of English Literature series (Clarendon Press, 1986).
 The Oxford Companion to Chaucer (Oxford University Press, 2003).
 Later Medieval English Literature (Oxford University Press, 2008).
 The Phoenix and the Parrot: Skelton and the Language of Satire (University of Otago Press, 2012).
 Simple Forms: Essays on Medieval English Popular Literature (Oxford University Press, 2015).

References 

1930 births
2017 deaths
Fellows of the British Academy
Fellows of Lady Margaret Hall, Oxford
English literature academics
Alumni of Merton College, Oxford
Fellows of Pembroke College, Oxford
Victoria University of Wellington alumni
Academic staff of the Victoria University of Wellington